Der Orchideengarten ('The Orchids-garden'; subtitled Phantastische Blätter or 'Fantastic Pages') was a German magazine that was published for 51 issues from January 1919 until November 1921.

History and profile
Founded four years before the American magazine Weird Tales was initiated in March 1923, Der Orchideengarten is considered to be the first fantasy magazine. Also described as largely 'supernatural horror', it was edited by World War I correspondent and freelance writer Karl Hans Strobl and Alfons von Czibulka, published by Dreiländerverlag. It had 24 pages per issue printed on rough book paper.

The magazine included a wide selection of new and reprinted stories by both German-language and foreign writers. The main source
of the translated material Der Orchideengarteen published was French literature; Der Orchideengarten
published works by such authors as Voltaire, Charles Nodier, Guy de Maupassant, Théophile Gautier, Victor Hugo, Villiers de l'Isle-Adam and  Guillaume Apollinaire. Other noted writers such as Apuleius, Charles Dickens, Pushkin, Edgar Allan Poe, Washington Irving, Amelia Edwards, Nathaniel Hawthorne, H. G. Wells, Valery Bryusov and Karel and Josef Čapek were all published in Der Ochideengarten. German language writers for the magazine included Strobl, Hermann Harry Schmitz, Leo Perutz 
and Alexander Moritz Frey, as well as reprinted stories by E. T. A. Hoffmann. Illustrations included reproductions of medieval woodcuts and  pictures by Gustave Dore and Tony Johannot, as well as contemporary artists such as Rolf von Hoerschelmann (1885–1947), 
Otto Linnekogel (1892–1981), Karl Ritter (1888-?), Heinrich Kley, Alfred Kubin,  Eric Godal (1899–1969), Carl Rabus, (1898–1982) (famous for his work in the magazine Jugend)  Otto Nückel and Max Schenke (1891–1957).

References

External links

The World's First Fantasy Magazine - Der Orchideengarten - covers, further info
Hathi Trust: Der Orchideengarten - full-view scans of bound issues, years 1–3

1919 establishments in Germany
1921 disestablishments in Germany
Defunct magazines published in Germany
Fantasy fiction magazines
German-language magazines
Visual arts magazines published in Germany
Horror fiction magazines
Magazines established in 1919
Magazines disestablished in 1921